Heilwig of Lippe, also known as Heilwig of Schaumburg ( – ) was a German noblewoman. She was counress of Holstein by marriage to Adolf IV of Holstein.

Life 
She was a daughter of Lord Herman II of Lippe and his wife, Oda of Tecklenburg.

On 14 February 1246, she founded the Cistercian monastery in Herwardeshude, a village at the mouth of the Pepermölenbek, between the later St. Pauli and Altona.  The monastery was confirmed by Pope Innocent IV in 1247.  This monastery later founded the monasteries , also in Herwardeshude, and in 1530, after the reformation, the Monastery of St. John, which still exists as a Protestant nunnery.

Legacy 

Marriage and issue 
She was married to Count Adolf IV of Holstein-Kiel and Schauenburg.  They had at least three children:
 John I
 Gerhard I
 Matilda

Ancestors

References 
Silke Urbanski: Geschichte des Klosters Harvestehude „In valle virginum“. Wirtschaftliche, soziale und politische Entwicklung eines Nonnenklosters bei Hamburg 1245-1530 (Dissertationsschrift), Münster 1996,

External links 
 Homepage of the St. John's monastery, viewed on 1 October 2010
 Genealogy of Bernard IV of Lippe, viewed on 1 October 2010

13th-century German women
House of Lippe
House of Schauenburg
Year of birth unknown
13th-century deaths
Year of death unknown
13th-century German nobility
Daughters of monarchs